The 2012 IIHF World Championship was the 76th IIHF World Championship, an annual international ice hockey tournament. It took place between 4–20 May 2012 in Helsinki, Finland and Stockholm, Sweden. This tournament determined the countries' seeding for the men's Olympic Ice Hockey tournament in Sochi for the 2014 Winter Olympics, and for all countries participating in the qualification program leading up to the Olympics.

Russia won the tournament by defeating Slovakia 6–2 in the Final game; the Russians finished the tournament undefeated with a record of 10–0–0, becoming the first team to win every game in regulation since the Soviet Union in the 1989 World Championships. The Czech Republic captured the bronze medal by defeating co-host Finland 3–2 in the bronze medal game. The tournament's top scorer, Russia's Evgeni Malkin, was named the most valuable player of the tournament.

Host selection
At the IIHF congress in Moscow in 2007 four nations submitted bids to host the 2012 World Championship: Finland, Sweden, the Czech Republic and Hungary. The Hungarian and Czech bids were withdrawn before the vote, which was then contested by Finland and Sweden. Finland won with 64 votes to Sweden's 35. Sweden later won the vote to host the 2013 World Championship. At the congress in Bern in 2009, it was announced that Finland and Sweden would instead co-host both the 2012 and 2013 tournaments.

Kimmo Leinonen served as the general secretary of the jointly-hosted events.

Voting results

Venues
Group A preliminary round and quarterfinals were played in Hartwall Areena, Helsinki. Group B preliminary round and quarterfinals were played in Ericsson Globe, Stockholm. All semifinal and medal games were played at the Hartwall Areena.

Format
For the first time since 2000, a new format was adopted in the IIHF World Hockey Championships. The preliminary round and qualification round were merged into one (two pools of eight teams), with the top four teams from each pool advancing to the quarterfinals.

Rosters

Each team's roster for the 2012 IIHF World Championship consisted of at least 15 skaters (forwards, and defencemen) and 2 goaltenders, and at most 22 skaters and 3 goaltenders. All sixteen participating nations, through the confirmation of their respective national associations, had to submit a roster by the first IIHF directorate meeting.

Summary

Preliminary round
Group H (Helsinki)
This group saw the three favourites, Canada, the United States and Finland advance pretty easily. All three teams advanced a day before the group play was done. Canada lost just one game, their second game, against the Americans in overtime. The Americans themselves needed to win their last game against Switzerland to capture the second place in the group ahead of Finland and did so with the result being 5–2. For the final spot of advancing, Slovakia and France played in a "final", where France needed a win to advance to the quarterfinals. The game was close throughout, tied the whole way until it was 4–4, this is when Slovakia scored the final and decisive goal to win 5–4 and get to the fourth spot in the group. France, Switzerland were eliminated alongside Belarus, with Kazakhstan finishing in the last spot and being relegated. They ended the tournament with one point, by losing to the United States in overtime.
Canada faced Slovakia, and the United States played against Finland in the quarterfinals.

Group S (Stockholm)
Russia went through the group undefeated by winning all seven games. Co-host Sweden captured the second place, after falling short to Russia. Czech Republic rounded up the third place and advanced to the quarterfinals. Norway, Latvia and Germany all fought for the last spot in the next round but Germany was eliminated after failing miserably 4–12 to Norway. Latvia lost to Denmark and was eliminated, which meant that Norway advanced. Italy finished last and was relegated to Division I.
In the quarterfinals, Russia took on Norway, while Sweden battled the Czech Republic.

Quarterfinals
Canada vs. Slovakia
The Slovak team was the underdog going against Team Canada who had lost just one game so far. But the game started with a surprising strong start by Slovakia, who scored twice in the first 10 minutes to get a 2–0 lead. Evander Kane was able to cut into the lead before going into the first break. In the second period Canada scored twice and got the lead and Slovakia was down by one going into the last period. With just 6 and a half minutes to go Milan Bartovič tied the game before Michal Handzuš even took the lead with a bit over two minutes to go. Canada pulled the goalie but was not able to connect against and lost 3–4. The crowd was stunned and the surprise perfect, Slovakia advanced to the semifinals while Canada was eliminated.

Russia vs. Norway
The undefeated Russian team added Alexander Semin and Alexander Ovechkin to their roster before the quarterfinals.
Ovechkin went right away and scored the equalizer after Per-Åge Skrøder gave Norway the lead. After Russia took the lead, Patrick Thoresen made it a tied game just 28 seconds after the second period started, with his 18th point of the tournament. The game went into the last period tied, 2–2. Not even one minute into the third period, Alexei Emelin gave Russia the lead. After Russia raised the lead to two, Ilya Nikulin finished Norway off by making it a 5–2 lead with just five minutes to go. Norway was outshot 45–21 and eliminated.

United States vs. Finland
Co-Host Finland tried to advance against the US-team who they lost to in the preliminary round. The first period ended scoreless, before Jesse Joensuu broke the tie, just to be answered 21 seconds later by Kyle Palmieri. With the game going 1–1 into the last period, the United States took the lead with under two minutes played. Mikko Koivu tied the game seven minutes before the end of the game. With everyone expecting an overtime, Jesse Joensuu struck again, just nine seconds before the end. The US pulled the goalie but never had another chance and were eliminated.

Sweden vs. Czech Republic
The last quarterfinals saw Co-host Sweden going up against the Czech team. The first period ended in a 2–1 lead for the Czech Republic after Sweden took the lead early on. Martin Erat scored and gave the Czechs a two-goal lead before Henrik Zetterberg cut into the lead 45 seconds before the end of the second period. Jonathan Ericsson continued the Swedish way of climbing back by tying the game just 45 seconds into the last period. Both teams had their chance in the next few minutes, Sweden hit the post and the Czechs failed to score against Viktor Fasth. 29 seconds before the end, Michálek took the puck away from a Swedish defender and scored. Sweden pulled the goalie and had one last chance but it was missed and the Czech advanced to the semifinals. The Czechs became the first team since Finland in 2000 to eliminate Sweden in a World Championship quarterfinal.

Semifinals
Russia vs. Finland
Seven minutes into the game, Janne Niskala gave Finland the lead. Two goals from Evgeni Malkin brought Russia back into the game going into the first intermission. In the second period Alexander Ovechkin increased the lead to 3–1; a while later Malkin would increase Russia's lead to 4–1. Denis Kokarev then scored another goal and with Russia in control of the game, yet another after that. Four minutes before the end of the game Mikael Granlund scored the last goal of the game, as it ended 6–2 in favour of Russia although they were out-shot 23 to 31. Malkin was the player of the game with scoring a hat trick to give him 18 points for the tournament. Russia advanced to the final to try to win their twenty-sixth title, while Finland will battle for bronze.

Czech Republic vs. Slovakia
The Slovak team tried to continue their ride at this championship by advancing to the final even though the Czech team was the favorite before the game started. The game started slow, but Miroslav Šatan broke the tie 15 minutes into the game to give Slovakia the lead. Another 15 minutes in, this time the second period, Michael Frolík made it a 1–1 game going into the last period. The third period was not more than one minute old, when Šatan struck again with his second goal, despite Slovakia being shorthanded. Libor Hudáček then gave Slovakia a two-goal lead four minutes later. The Czech team had 15 minutes to turn the game around but did not create enough opportunities. They pulled their goaltender with two minutes to go, but Slovakia kept up their defense well enough not to concede another goal. Slovakia finished off another upset and advanced to the final, while the Czech Republic plays in the bronze medal game. Slovakia had no penalties but was outshot by nine.

Bronze medal game
The bronze medal game featured Finland and the Czech Republic. The Czechs took the lead in the first period before Finland tied the game at one, three minutes before the first break. Jiří Novotný and David Krejčí raised the lead to two goals, being 3–1 at the first intermission. The second period went scoreless before the Finnish team got new hope when Jussi Jokinen scored a goal ten minutes before the end of the game. But they did not score again, and the Czech team captured the bronze medal and Finland ended the tournament in fourth place.

Gold medal game

The gold medal game featured Russia and Slovakia. Slovakia played in the World Championship final game for the first time since 2002, while Russia advanced to their fourth gold medal game in the last five years. Russia defeated Slovakia 6–2 to take home the gold medal from the tournament. The Russian team went through the tournament undefeated.

Nations
The following 16 nations qualified for the elite-pool tournament. 13 nations from Europe, 2 nations from North America and 1 nation from Asia are represented.

Asia
 
Europe

 
 
 
 †
 
 
 
 
 
 
 
 
 

North America

Officials
The IIHF selected 16 referees and 16 linesmen to work the 2012 IIHF World Championship. They were the following:
Referees

  Vladimír Baluška
  Antti Boman
  Lars Brüggemann
  Vyacheslav Bulanov
  Martin Fraňo
  Georg Jablukov
  Antonín Jeřábek
  Morgan Johansson
  Keith Kaval
  Danny Kurmann
  Christer Lärking
  Jari Levonen
  David Lewis
  Konstantin Olenin
  Steve Patafie
  Brent Reiber

Linesmen

  Roger Arm
  Petr Blumel
  Jimmy Dahmen
  Ivan Dedioulia
  Pierre Dehaen
  François Dussureault
  Jon Killian
  Jonathan Morisson
  Masi Puolakka
  Andre Schrader
  Sirko Schulz
  Anton Semionov
  Sergei Shelyanin
  Sakari Suominen
  Miroslav Valach
  Jesse Wilmot

Seeding and groups

The seeding in the preliminary round was based on the 2011 IIHF World Ranking, which ended at the conclusion of the 2011 IIHF World Championship. The teams were grouped accordingly by seeding (in parenthesis is the corresponding world ranking):

Group H (Helsinki)
  (2)
  (4)
  (6)
  (7)
  (10)
  (11)
  (14)
  (16)

Group S (Stockholm)
  (1)
  (3)
  (5)
  (8)
  (9)
  (12)
  (13)
  (17)

Preliminary round
The top four teams in each group moved to the quarterfinals where the group winner met the fourth place, and the group runner-up met the third place within the same group. The last placed team in each group was relegated to Division I, Group A.

Group H

All times are local (UTC+3).

Group S

All times are local (UTC+2).

Playoff round

Quarterfinals
The games in Stockholm are UTC+2, while the games in Helsinki are UTC+3.

Semifinals
All times are local (UTC+3).

Bronze medal game
Time is local (UTC+3).

Gold medal game

Time is local (UTC+3).

Ranking and statistics

Tournament awards
 Best players selected by the directorate:
 Best Goaltender:  Ján Laco
 Best Defenceman:  Zdeno Chára
 Best Forward:  Evgeni Malkin
 Most Valuable Player:  Evgeni Malkin
 Media All-Star Team:
 Goaltender:  Ján Laco
 Defence:  Zdeno Chára,  Ilya Nikulin
 Forwards:  Evgeni Malkin,  Patrick Thoresen,  Henrik Zetterberg

Final standings
The official IIHF final standings of the tournament:

Scoring leaders
List shows the top skaters sorted by points, then goals. If the list exceeds 10 skaters because of a tie in points, all of the tied skaters are shown.

GP = Games played; G = Goals; A = Assists; Pts = Points; +/− = Plus/minus; PIM = Penalties in minutes; POS = Position
Source: IIHF.com

Leading goaltenders
Only the top ten goaltenders, based on save percentage, who have played 40% of their team's minutes, are included in this list.

TOI = Time on ice (minutes:seconds); SA = Shots against; GA = Goals against; GAA = Goals against average; Sv% = Save percentage; SO = Shutouts
Source: IIHF.com

IIHF broadcasting rights
Over 100 countries broadcast the matches, live or near-live transmissions, of the 2012 tournament.

References

External links

 Official website

 
IIHF World Championship
1
IIHF World Championship
2012 IIHF World Championship
2012 IIHF World Championship
World
World
International sports competitions in Helsinki
May 2012 sports events in Europe
International sports competitions in Stockholm
2010s in Stockholm
2010s in Helsinki